is a Japanese footballer who are playing for Japanese club Cerveza FC Tokyo as a midfielder.
He was educated at and played for Aoyama Gakuin University. He moved to Tampines Rovers in 2017 after impressing in a trial.

Club career
Before he sign for the Stags, he was playing for Tsukuba FC in the Kantō Soccer League, where he score a grand total of 10 goals in 29 games for the club. In December 2016, he announced that he will be leaving the club to further his footballing career elsewhere.

In February 2017, Megumi signed a 10 months contract  with S.League side Tampines Rovers FC for the 2017 S.League season.  He scored on his league debut in a 1-2 loss to 2016 S.League champions Albirex Niigata Singapore FC after he was set up by fellow new signing Ivan Jakov Džoni.

He scored his first brace for the club in a 4-0 demolition of Geylang International while assisting another two goals. In total, Megumi netted 14 goals in the league for his new club.

Megumi ended the season as the Stags' top-scorer and was also nominated for the S.League Player of the Year award. In December 2017, the club announced that he will  be renewing his contract with the club  .

Career statistics

Club

References

1993 births
Living people
Japanese footballers
Singapore Premier League players
Tampines Rovers FC players
Japanese expatriate footballers
Expatriate footballers in Singapore
Japanese expatriate sportspeople in Singapore
Association football forwards